Venalex is a micronized purified flavonoid  fraction containing 90% diosmin and 10% hesperidin.

Therapeutic indications 
Symptomatic treatment of chronic functional or structural venous insufficiency of the lower limbs.
Lymphedema. Symptomatic treatment of hemorrhoids. Ailments caused by pressure ulcers.

Dosage 
2 capsules per day. Do not exceed the recommended daily dose. Nutritional supplement cannot substitute for a healthy, balanced diet.

Additional information 
Venalex is usually very well tolerated by the body and very rare side effects associated with its use.

References 
 http://www.venalex.pl

Flavonoids
Drugs acting on the cardiovascular system
Drug brand names